The Advanced Research and Invention Agency Act 2022  is an Act of Parliament of the United Kingdom that creates the Advanced Research and Invention Agency. It was introduced in the House of Commons by the Secretary of State for Business, Energy and Industrial Strategy Kwasi Kwarteng on 2 March 2021.

Background 

The Government have said that the Advanced Research and Invention Agency (ARIA) is an attempt to emulate the United States' Advanced Research Projects Agency (ARPA) and similar governmental agencies such as in Germany and Japan.

Former adviser to Prime Minister Boris Johnson, Dominic Cummings, is credited with inspiring the Government to push forward with this policy. Cummings was called in front of the Science and Technology Select Committee's inquiry into the plans for ARIA.

Notable amendments

Purpose of ARIA 
The SNP's Business spokesperson Stephen Flynn and Labour's Shadow Minister for Science, Research and Digital Chi Onwurah pushed an amendment to a division that would have changed the primary objective of ARIA to focus on net-zero technologies. All parties supported the amendment except the Conservatives and the DUP. The amendments failed.

Freedom of Information 
Labour also put forward an amendment that would have put ARIA under the scope of the Freedom of Information Act 2000 as the Act has an exemption. This amendment also failed.

References 

Advanced Research and Invention Agency
2022 in British law
United Kingdom Acts of Parliament 2022